Nelson Javier Ozuna (born 19 January 1985) is a Dominican Republic badminton player.

Career 
In 2013, he became the runner-up of the Guatemala International tournament in mixed doubles event. In 2015, he won bronze medal at the XVII Pan American Games in men's doubles event.

Achievements

Pan American Games 
Men's doubles

Pan Am Championships 
Men's doubles

Central American and Caribbean Games 
Mixed doubles

BWF International Challenge/Series 
Men's singles

Men's doubles

Mixed doubles

  BWF International Challenge tournament
  BWF International Series tournament
  BWF Future Series tournament

References

External links 
 

1985 births
Living people
Dominican Republic male badminton players
Badminton players at the 2003 Pan American Games
Badminton players at the 2011 Pan American Games
Badminton players at the 2015 Pan American Games
Badminton players at the 2019 Pan American Games
Pan American Games bronze medalists for the Dominican Republic
Pan American Games medalists in badminton
Competitors at the 2002 Central American and Caribbean Games
Competitors at the 2006 Central American and Caribbean Games
Competitors at the 2010 Central American and Caribbean Games
Competitors at the 2014 Central American and Caribbean Games
Competitors at the 2018 Central American and Caribbean Games
Central American and Caribbean Games bronze medalists for the Dominican Republic
Central American and Caribbean Games medalists in badminton
Medalists at the 2015 Pan American Games
21st-century Dominican Republic people